Adrian Clarke (born July 9, 1991) is a professional Canadian football linebacker who is a free agent. He attended Bishop's University.

Early career 

Clarke played high school football at Father Michael Goetz Secondary School, where he also played basketball and track and field. He played college football for the Bishop's Gaiters from 2011 to 2014 at the linebacker and safety positions, recording 101 solo tackles and seven sacks over 34 games. He was invited to the 2013 East-West Bowl game.

Professional career 

Clarke recorded the fastest 40-yard dash time at the CFL Combine among the linebackers that participated. He was drafted in the fourth round of the 2015 CFL Draft by the BC Lions with the 32nd overall pick. After making the active roster to start the 2015 season, Clarke made his CFL debut in the Lions' first game of the season against the Ottawa Redblacks, where he completed two special teams tackles. He spent the 2018 season with the Saskatchewan Roughriders and did not play professionally in 2019. 

On January 31, 2020, Clarke re-signed with the BC Lions. He signed a contract extension with the team on December 15, 2020. He was released on March 19, 2021.

References

External links
 BC Lions profile
 

1991 births
Living people
Canadian football linebackers
BC Lions players
Bishop's Gaiters football players
Players of Canadian football from Ontario
Sportspeople from Mississauga
Saskatchewan Roughriders players